Niuafoʻou Airport , also known as Kuini Lavinia Airport, is an airport in Niuafo'ou, Tonga.

Facilities

References

Airports in Tonga
Niuas